Ganja-Dashkasan Economic Region is one of the 14 economic regions of Azerbaijan. It borders Georgia to the north and Armenia to the south, as well as the economic regions of Shaki-Zagatala, Central Aran, Karabakh, East Zangezur, and Gazakh-Tovuz. The region consists of the districts of Dashkasan, Goranboy, Goygol, Samukh, as well as the cities of Ganja and Naftalan. Its population was estimated to be at 611.3 thousand people in January 2021.

History 
Ganja-Dashkasan Economic Region was established on 7 July 2021 as part of a reform of the economic region system of Azerbaijan. Its territory was part of the larger Ganja-Qazakh Economic Region prior to 2021.

References 

Economic regions of Azerbaijan